Daniel Blanc-Gonnet (born July 27, 1994 in Portland, Oregon), is an American International motorcycle trials rider. Blanc-Gonnet was NATC National Trials Expert 125cc champion in 2011 and runner-up in the NATC Pro Championship in 2018.

Biography
In 2011 Blanc-Gonnet became the 125cc NATC National Champion after taking 5 wins out of the seven rounds.

A move up to the Expert class was on the cards for 2012, and he made the most of it taking podiums in California, Ohio and both days at the end of season  Rhode Island event. This was enough for 4th overall in the championship.

Making a good start to the 2013 season, Blanc-Gonnet placed 2nd and 3rd in New York. When the series moved to Vermont a 3rd on day one was followed by a disappointing 8th on day two. But the season came around and good placings in Arizona, New Mexico and Minnesota brought him up to 2nd place in the series. Blanc-Gonnet moved up to the NATC Pro class for the final event of the season, placing 8th.

2014 was his first full season in the Pro class and he rode well, finishing 4th overall.

Work commitments limited Blanc-Gonnet's 2015 season to only four rounds, but he got on the podium in both of the last rounds in Wyoming for a creditable 7th place series finish.

In 2016 he signed for the factory Montesa team and was again 7th in the national series after facing some stiff competition all year. He joined fellow riders Andrew Putt and Brian Roper in the American Trial des Nations team in France where they placed 4th in the International Trophy class. 

One step higher in 2017 with 6th in the NATC Pro championship.

Gas Gas US announced that Blanc-Gonnet had been signed for their US factory team to compete in the NATC series. 2018 saw Blanc-Gonnet put in his best rides so far. He took runner-up positions in New Mexico, Colorado, Arizona and California, ending the season in 2nd place behind Sherco rider Patrick Smage. Blanc-Gonnet also won the prestigious Colorado Ute Cup event for 2018 which has been held every year since 1970 by the Rocky Mountain Trials Association.

National Trials Championship Career

Honors
 US National NATC Expert 125 Trials Champion 2011
 Ute Cup winner 2018

See also
NATC Trials Championship
FIM Trial European Championship
FIM Trial World Championship

References 

1994 births
Living people
American motorcycle racers
Motorcycle trials riders
Sportspeople from Portland, Oregon